A number of steamships have been named Cuxhaven, including:-

 , a HAPAG ship in service 1866–1886
 , a cargo ship
 , a HAPAG ship in service September–October 1943

Ship names